Reginald Thomas Hede (9 October 1894 – 16 April 1970) was an Australian rules footballer who played in the VFL between 1914 and 1921 for the Richmond Football Club.

Family
The son of Francis Hede (1852-1907), and Mary Hede (1856-1922), née Brennan, Reginald Thomas Hede was born in East Ballarat on 9 October 1894.

Football
Midway through the 1921 season Hede transferred from Richmond to the Camberwell Football Club (prior to its admission to the VFA) in the Victorian Sub District League, and played in premiership winning teams for the next three seasons.

Footnotes

References
Hogan P: The Tigers Of Old, Richmond FC, Melbourne 1996

External links
 
 
 Reg Hede at Boyles Football Photos

Richmond Football Club players
Richmond Football Club Premiership players
Camberwell Football Club players
Australian rules footballers from Ballarat
1894 births
1970 deaths
One-time VFL/AFL Premiership players